Kani Ashkut or Kani Eshkut may refer to:
 Kani Eshkut, Piranshahr
 Kani Ashkut, Lajan, Piranshahr County